Explore Technologies, Inc. was founded in Sunnyvale, California in 1995. Its offices were located at 2880 Lakeside Drive, Suite 130.

Products

Odyssey Atlasphere 
The first product released was Odyssey, The World's First Altasphere, an interactive, talking globe.
.  It was released in early 1997, as a late release for the 1996 Christmas season.  Its retail price was $299 and it was sold through specialty retailers such as Sharper Image and Hammacher Schlemmer.  In 1997 the price was increased to $399.  The product received wide positive praise and several educational awards, but was not a retail success due to its limited distribution and relatively high retail price.

The user interacted with the globe by touching the surface of the globe with an attached pen.  The globe then calculated a latitude/longitude position which was used to determine the location touched.  This position sensing was implemented using a patented technology called NearTouch developed by Explore Technologies.

Included Facts 
Odyssey contained over 50 facts about most of the world's countries.  These facts were accessed by touching a location on the globe and the appropriate fact button on the control panel.
Country
 Name
 Capital
 Government
 Status
 Political subdivisions
 Date Established
 Admitted to the Union
People
 Population
 Density
 Urban Population
 Growth Rate
 Population Doubling Time
 Life Expectancy
 Birth Rate
 Death Rate
 People per Telephone
 Literacy Rate
 Religions
 Official Languages
 Commonly Spoken Languages
Land
 Total Area
 Highest Point
 Lowest Point
 Deepest Point
 Average Depth
Money
 Currency
 Gross Domestic Product
 Purchasing Power
 Income distribution
 Energy Consumption
 Energy Production
 Government Budget
 Imports
 Exports
 Import Trading Partners
 Export Trading Partners
 Average Income
 Climate
 Precipitation
 Music
 Traditional & National Athems
 Time
 Local Time
 Distance
 Distance between two touched points
 Travel time between two touched points
 Compare
 Compare facts between two touched locations

Updates 
The product was designed with a removable globe sphere and connector to accept an updated fact database.  No updates were ever released for the product.

GeoZone Cartridge 
The Geozone cartridge was included with each Odyssey globe.  It was actually a dummy cartridge.  Inserted, the cartridge activated code contained in the base unit.

Eureka 
In a series of 45 second rounds, you are asked to touch the announced countries as quickly as you can. An incorrect touch will produce hints guiding you towards the target country.

Globesurfer 
Players are asked to touch three countries that are announced.  Next players are asked a series of questions whose answer is one of the three countries.  Questions such as, "which country has the largest population?" or "which country has the largest area?".

Solo Trek 
A version of the Eureka game where the object is to locate all of the world's countries in as few 45 second rounds as possible.

Metropolis Cartridge 
Metropolis was a retail cartridge that allowed the user to touch and receive information about 500 cities from around the world.

GeoMania Cartridge 
GeoMania was a retail cartridge.

Acquisition by LeapFrog 

Explore Technologies, Inc. was acquired by LeapFrog on July 22, 1998.  The explore team produced $99 and $129 versions of the Odyssey globe released under the LeapFrog label in 1999.  The NearTouch technology was then applied to the LeapPad learning platform also released in 1999.

References 

Toy companies of the United States
Companies based in Sunnyvale, California
Defunct companies based in California